The Summoned is an original novel based on the U.S. television series Angel. Tagline: "Who is next to be marked for death?"

Plot summary
Doyle's at the supermarket when his latest vision comes. He sees images of fear, fire, death, and an ornately engraved old amulet. The Powers That Be are not being too specific. When Doyle awakens an anxious young woman named Terri Miller is helping him.

Terri is a shy woman from a small town, and new to Los Angeles. Soon after meeting Doyle, who disappears without saying thank-you, a charismatic man invites her to meet him at a club to which he belongs.

Meanwhile, Angel and his team are investigating a murderer who seems to be burning his victims beyond recognition. Several of the dead are connected to Terri's newfound friends, and Cordy suddenly finds herself with an amulet that seems very familiar.

Continuity
Supposed to be set early in Angel season 1, before the episode "Hero"
Characters include: Angel, Cordelia, Doyle, Kate Lockley.

Canonical issues

Angel books such as this one are not usually considered by fans as canonical. Some fans consider them stories from the imaginations of authors and artists, while other fans consider them as taking place in an alternative fictional reality. However unlike fan fiction, overviews summarising their story, written early in the writing process, were 'approved' by both Fox and Joss Whedon (or his office), and the books were therefore later published as officially Buffy/Angel merchandise.

External links

Reviews
Litefoot1969.bravepages.com - Review of this book by Litefoot
Teen-books.com - Reviews of this book
Shadowcat.name - Review of this book

Angel (1999 TV series) novels
2001 fantasy novels